Intel graphics may refer to:

Intel740, a graphics processing unit released in 1998
Intel Extreme Graphics, a series of integrated graphics released from 2002 to 2003
Intel Graphics Media Accelerator (GMA), a series of integrated graphics released from 2005 to 2008
Larrabee (microarchitecture), the code name for an unreleased Intel graphics processing unit
Intel HD and Iris Graphics, a series of processor-based graphics first released in 2010
A table of all Intel graphics processing units and integrated graphics released since the Intel740